The 2012 Coors Light Cash Spiel was held from November 23 to 25 at the Duluth Curling Club in Duluth, Minnesota as part of the 2012–13 World Curling Tour. It was held in conjunction with the 2012 Molson Cash Spiel. The event was held in a round robin format, and the purse for the event was USD$14,400. In the final, Bryan Burgess of Ontario defeated John Shuster of Minnesota in an extra end with a score of 6–5.

Teams
The teams are listed as follows:

Round-robin standings
Final round-robin standings

Playoffs
The playoffs draw is listed as follows:

References

External links

2012 in curling
Curling in Minnesota